Umberto Ripamonti (born 22 April 1895, date of death unknown) was an Italian racing cyclist. He rode in the 1924 Tour de France.

References

External links
 

1895 births
Year of death missing
Italian male cyclists
Place of birth missing
Cyclists from Milan